St. Oswald's Protestant Episcopal Church is a historic Episcopal church located near Skidmore, Atchison County, Missouri. It was built in 1892, and is a one-story, cruciform plan, Shingle style building on a brick foundation.  It is sheathed in rough-sawn weatherboard and has a gable roof.

It was listed on the National Register of Historic Places in 1992.

References

Churches completed in 1892
Episcopal church buildings in Missouri
Shingle Style architecture in Missouri
Churches on the National Register of Historic Places in Missouri
Buildings and structures in Atchison County, Missouri
19th-century Episcopal church buildings
National Register of Historic Places in Atchison County, Missouri